Beringen Badischer Bahnhof is a railway station in the municipality of Beringen, in the Swiss canton of Schaffhausen. It is located on the standard gauge High Rhine Railway of Deutsche Bahn.

Services
 the following services stop at Beringen Badischer Bahnhof:

At peak times on work days there are additional quarterly-hour services running between Beringen and Schaffhausen, calling at Beringerfeld and Neuhausen Badischer Bahnhof.

References

External links

Railway stations in the canton of Schaffhausen
Railway stations in Switzerland opened in 1862